Clyde Sherman Golden (born December 30, 1928) is an American former professional pitcher in the Negro leagues. 

A native of Jacksonville, Florida, Golden played for the Newark Eagles in 1948.

References

External links
 and Seamheads

1928 births

Possibly living people
Newark Eagles players
Baseball pitchers
Baseball players from Jacksonville, Florida